James Milner (born 1986) is an English footballer.

James Milner may also refer to:

 James Milner, 9th Seigneur of Sark (died 1730), British nobleman
 James Milner (art historian) (1874–1927), British art executive
 James Milner, 1st Baron Milner of Leeds (1889–1967), British politician
 Jim Milner (James Edward Milner, born 1933), English footballer

See also 
 James Millner (disambiguation)
 Milner (disambiguation)